So Long, Scarecrow is the second and final studio album by the rock band Scarling.  Written and recorded in early 2005, and released on October 25, 2005. It is Scarling.'s only album to feature drummer Beth Gordon.  Its title is a reference to The Wizard of Oz: in lead vocalist Jessicka's view, the film's Scarecrow is a metaphor for the band itself; the character's initial lack of and search for a brain, she explains, parallels Scarling.'s search for new territory in a predictable and monotonous musical environment.

The album was preceded by the single "We Are the Music Makers," a split 7-inch with The Willowz, and has been reissued on vinyl by Sympathy for the Record Industry with alternative cover artwork by Mark Ryden.

Production and composition 
Nearly twice as long as the band's debut, Sweet Heart Dealer, So Long, Scarecrow differs from its predecessor not only in length but also in terms of musical atmosphere.  This is largely due to the switch in producers between the two albums — from former Nine Inch Nails member Chris Vrenna, whose abrasive, industrial-style production appeared on Sweet Heart Dealer; to
Rob Campanella, of the psychedelic rock group The Brian Jonestown Massacre, and Scarling. guitarist Christian Hejnal, himself influenced by noise rock and No Wave. The album was recorded at Campanella's studio, the Committee to Keep Music Evil Headquarters/Figment Sounds.

Reception 
So Long, Scarecrow received several favourable reviews: Alternative Press gave the album a 5 out of 5 rating  and described Hejnal as a "guitar physicist who holds court over these atmospheric rockers’ second album, approximating everything from space-station climates to sperm whales rollin’ on E, all while delivering solid songs." The Independent noted “Scarling. work up a wonderfully hazy guitar swirl, reminiscent of post-My Bloody Valentine noise-pop from the Britain of the early nineties.” and Bust described the album as "the musical equivalent of an Edward Gorey illustration: ominous and shadowy, but not without a certain sense of morbid joy. Sly lyrics and sarcastic insights pepper Scarecrow’s dystopian soundscape, proving that Scarling has picked up more than just wardrobe inspiration from vets like the Cure." While Jon Wiederhorn said, "guitarist Christian Hejnal, Scarling provide the much-needed element of violence and sexuality other modern shoegazers lack."

Track listing

Personnel
Jessicka — vocals
Christian Hejnal — guitar, bass, producer, mixing
Rickey Lime — guitar
Beth Gordon — drums
Rob Campanella — producer, engineer
Erik Colvin — producer, vocal tracking
Richard Mouser — mixing
John Vestman — mastering, mixing
Piper Ferguson — photography, cover art
Mark Ryden — alternate LP cover art

References

Scarling. albums
2005 albums
Sympathy for the Record Industry albums